The 2014–15 West Coast Conference women's basketball season began with practices in October 2014 and ended with the 2015 West Coast Conference women's basketball tournament at the Orleans Arena March 5–10, 2015 in Paradise, Nevada. The regular season began in November, with the conference schedule starting at the end of December.

This was the 30th season for WCC women's basketball, which began in the 1985–86 season when the league was known as the West Coast Athletic Conference (WCAC). It was also the 26th season under the West Coast Conference name (the conference began as the California Basketball Association in 1952, became the WCAC in 1956, and dropped the word "Athletic" in 1989).

Pre-season
 Pre-season media day took place in October at the Time Warner Cable SportsNet and Time Warner Cable Deportes Studios. Video interviews were hosted on the WCC's streaming video outlet, TheW.tv, beginning at 11:30 AM PDT. Jeff Lampe of WCC Live interviewed each coach and got a preview of their respective season. The regional television schedule announcement, the Pre-season Conference team, and the pre-season coaches rankings were some of the additional events that took place.

2014–15 West Coast Women's Basketball Media Poll
Rank, School (first-place votes), Points
1. Gonzaga (7), 78
2. BYU (2), 71
3. San Diego (1), 65
4. Pacific, 60
5. Saint Mary's, 48
6. San Francisco, 37
7. Portland, 32
8. Loyola Marymount, 27
9. Pepperdine, 17
10. Santa Clara, 15

2014–15 West Coast Women's Preseason All-West Conference Team
Player, School, Yr., Pos.
Morgan Bailey, BYU, Sr., F
Zhane Dikes, San Francisco, Jr., G
Lexi Eaton, BYU, Jr., G
Nici Gilday, Santa Clara, Sr., G
Sunny Greinacher, Gonzaga, Sr., F
Malina Hood, San Diego, Jr., F
Deanna Johnson, Loyola Marymount, Jr., G
Kendall Kenyon, Pacific, Sr., F
Taylor Proctor, San Francisco, Jr., F
Jasmine Wooton, Portland, Sr., G

Rankings
The AP Poll does not do a post-season rankings. As a result, their last rankings are Week 19. The Coaches Poll does a post-season poll and the end of the NCAA Tournament.

Non-Conference games
Gonzaga defeated #22 Dayton 75—65.
Saint Mary's won the 2014 Hilton Concord Classic.
Santa Clara won the 2014 Air Force Classic.
Loyola Marymount won the 2014 DoubleTree LA Thanksgiving Classic.

Conference games

Composite Matrix
This table summarizes the head-to-head results between teams in conference play. (x) indicates games remaining this season.

Conference tournament

  March 5–10, 2015– West Coast Conference Basketball Tournament, Orleans Arena, Paradise, Nevada.

Head coaches
The 2014-15 season saw a lot of new faces to the WCC. Three of the conference members had new head coaches. Kelly Graves left the Zags to become the new head coach at Oregon, Jim Sollars retired, and Jennifer Mountain did not have her contract renewed. As a result Gonzaga, Portland, and Santa Clara all introduced new coaches into the fold.

Jeff Judkins, BYU
Lisa Mispley Fortier, Gonzaga
Charity Elliott, Loyola Marymount
Lynne Roberts, Pacific
Ryan Weisenberg, Pepperdine
Cheryl Sorensen, Portland
Paul Thomas, Saint Mary's
Cindy Fisher, San Diego
Jennifer Azzi, San Francisco
JR Payne, Santa Clara

Postseason

NCAA tournament

WNIT

WBI

No WCC teams participated in the 2015 WBI.

Awards and honors

WCC Player-of-the-Week
The WCC player of the week awards are given each Monday once the season begins.

 Nov. 17- Maya Hood, G, San Diego 
 Dec. 1- Lauren Nicholson, G, Saint Mary's 
 Dec. 15- Morgan Bailey, F, BYU
 Dec. 30- Kendall Kenyon, F, Pacific 
 Jan. 12- Kendall Kenyon, F, Pacific 
 Jan. 26- Elle Tinkle, G, Gonzaga
 Feb. 9- Lexi Eaton, G, BYU
 Feb. 23- Leslie Lopez-Wood, G, Loyola Marymount
 Nov. 24- Sophia Ederaine, F, San Diego
 Dec. 8- Nici Gilday, G, Santa Clara 
 Dec. 22- Taylor Proctor, F, San Francisco 
 Jan. 5- Lauren Nicholson, G, Saint Mary's 
 Jan. 19- Sophia Ederaine, F, San Diego
 Feb. 2- Morgan Bailey, F, BYU
 Feb. 16- Shannon Mauldin, G, Saint Mary's
 Mar. 2- Taylor Proctor, F, San Francisco

College Madnesss West Coast Player of the Week
College Madness WCC player of the Week Awards will be given every Sunday once the season begins.

Nov. 16- Lindsay Sherbert, G, Gonzaga
 Nov. 30- Lauren Nicholson, G, Saint Mary's 
 Dec. 14- Morgan Bailey, F, BYU
 Dec. 28- Kendall Kenyon, F, Pacific 
 Jan. 11- Elle Tinkle, G, Gonzaga 
 Jan. 25- Taylor Proctor, F, San Francisco
 Feb. 8- Lexi Eaton, G, BYU
 Feb. 22-Sophia Ederaine, F, San Diego
Nov. 23- Madison Parrish, G, Pacific
 Dec. 7- Lexi Eaton, G, BYU
 Dec. 21- Taylor Proctor, F, San Francisco 
 Jan. 4- Morgan Bailey, F, BYU 
 Jan. 18- Cassandra Brown, F, Portland
 Feb. 1- Malina Hood, F, San Diego
 Feb. 15- Nici Gilday, G, Santa Clara
 Mar. 1- Taylor Proctor, F, San Francisco

All West Coast Conference teams
Voting was by conference coaches:
Player of The Year: Morgan Bailey, BYU
Newcomer of The Year: Stella Beck, Saint Mary's
Defensive Player of The Year: Sophia Ederaine, San Diego
Coach of The Year: Lisa Fortier, Gonzaga; Lynne Roberts, Pacific, & Paul Thomas, Saint Mary's

College Sports Madness Selections
Player of the Year: Sophia Ederaine, San Diego
Newcomer of the Year: Stella Beck, Saint Mary's
Coach of the Year: Lynne Roberts, Pacific

All-Conference First team 

College Sports Madness Selections

All-Conference Second team 

College Sports Madness Selections

Honorable mention

All-Freshman team

All Academic team

See also
2014-15 NCAA Division I women's basketball season
West Coast Conference women's basketball tournament
2014–15 West Coast Conference men's basketball season
West Coast Conference men's basketball tournament
2015 West Coast Conference men's basketball tournament

References